Radio City is an Independent Local Radio station based in Liverpool, England, owned and operated by Bauer as part of the Hits Radio network. It broadcasts to Merseyside, Cheshire and parts of north Wales.

As of December 2022, the station has a weekly audience of 303,000 listeners according to RAJAR.

History

After the introduction of the Sound Broadcasting Act in 1972 which allowed the legal operation of commercial radio in the UK, in 1974, Radio City (Sound of Merseyside) Ltd won the contract to broadcast the Independent Local Radio station for Liverpool and its surrounding areas, with studios originally based in Stanley Street in Liverpool City Centre.

194 Radio City began broadcasting at 5:58a.m. on 21 October 1974, with an announcement by its founding managing director Terry Smith (It's two minutes to six on Monday October 21st 1974. For the very first time, this is 194 Radio City broadcasting to Merseyside). The first song to be played on the station was Stevie Wonder's "You Are the Sunshine of My Life". As reflected in the name, the station originally broadcast on 1548 kHz AM, then known as 194 metres medium wave, from a transmitter at Rainford. The station was also given an FM frequency of 96.7 MHz, but did not begin broadcasting on FM until a few months later, after the transmitter was vandalised. In the early days of Marcher Sound, the evening programmes of the station were simulcasted to the fledgling station, so for a period in the 1980s, Radio City had in theory, four frequencies (Marcher Sound aired on 95.4 MHz and 1260 kHz).

In 1989, the Conservative government enforced new regulation to enable better choice by ceasing the simulcasting of radio stations on both AM and FM. Radio City split its frequencies by continuing its top 40 format on FM under the recently introduced new name City FM. On AM, a new talk station was launched called City Talk 1548 AM. This was unusual as most stations launched 'golden oldie' stations on their former AM frequencies. The City Talk experiment proved short-lived and Radio City Gold launched in its place in 1991, later known as City Gold. The AM service rebranded as Magic 1548 on Monday 17 March 1997.

In 1998, the company was bought out by EMAP Radio, who renamed the main FM station back to a modern version of its original name, as Radio City 96.7, the name it still uses currently. Two years later, the station left its original Stanley Street base and on Tuesday 18 July 2000, Radio City began broadcasting from St. John's Beacon, which in the past was a revolving restaurant and viewing platform.

The City Talk format was revived when, on 9 November 2006, it was announced by Ofcom that Radio City had beaten competition from rival broadcasters to win a new FM licence for a talk station for the Liverpool area. The new City Talk launched on 28 January 2008 and broadcasts on 105.9FM. Due to poor listening figures, the station has since dropped most of its presenters and had a format change which means, outside of peak listening hours like breakfast and drivetime, the station now broadcasts a mix of classic hit music similar to the music played on sister station Magic 1548, although under the format change the station is not allowed to simulcast with Magic, only Radio City.

In 2007 it was announced that Bauer Media Group was launching a UK based subsidiary of its Radio platform. Bauer took over all Emap owned radio stations and ultimately inherited St Johns Beacon. The takeover was completed in 2008 and Radio City then became part of the "Big City" Network, now the Hits Radio Network.

In September 2014, Bauer announced it would extend the Radio City brand by reviving the name on Magic 1548 as Radio City 2 and launching a new localised version of DAB station The Hits Radio, known as Radio City 3. The rebrand took place on 5 January 2015, with Radio City 3 due to launch on 19 January 2015. Radio City Talk was not affected.

This decision was later repealed in September 2017, when the Bauer City 3 branding was withdrawn in favour of The Hits across all Bauer City DAB Multiplexes. Radio City 2, which had moved to FM (swapping allocations with Radio City Talk) in December 2015, became Greatest Hits Radio Liverpool & The North West in January 2019.

On 31 May 2020, sister station Radio City Talk ceased broadcasting as it was deemed financially unviable to continue to run due to low listening figures.

Transmission
The 96.7 FM signal comes from the Allerton Park transmitter in south-east Liverpool, which also transmits BBC Radio Merseyside on 95.8 FM. and Radio City's sister station Greatest Hits Radio Liverpool & The North West.

There is also a transmitter in the Mersey (Queensway) Tunnel. There are DAB digital radio transmitters at St John's Beacon, Billinge Hill (in St Helens, which also carries Greatest Hits Radio Greater Manchester), and Hope Mountain (near Wrexham). The Billinge Hill site has the strongest digital signal.

Radio City Talk previously broadcast on Radio City's original AM frequency from a transmitter at the former Bebington/Bromborough Power Station site until 31 May 2020, when the station closed.

Programming
Networked programming originates from Bauer's Manchester studios.

Local programming is produced and broadcast from Bauer’s Liverpool studios at the Radio City Tower on weekdays from 6-10am, presented by Leanne Campbell and Scott Hughes.News
Bauer’s Liverpool newsroom broadcasts local news bulletins hourly from 6am-7pm on weekdays, and from 7am-1pm on Saturdays and Sundays. Headlines are broadcast on the half hour during weekday breakfast and drivetime shows, alongside traffic bulletins.

National bulletins from Sky News Radio are carried overnight with bespoke networked bulletins on weekend afternoons, usually originating from Bauer's Manchester newsroom.

Radio City formerly aired sports programming, focusing largely on Liverpool FC and Everton FC. Until the end of the 2014-15 season, the station aired live match commentaries of both clubs.

The station aired a twice-weekly Legends'' phone-in on Monday and Thursday evenings during the football season, hosted by John Aldridge and Graeme Sharp. However due to the partial cancellation of the 2019-20 Premier League, the show did not air in 2020. It was eventually cancelled in September 2020.

Notable past presenters

 
 Bill Bingham (now at Boom Radio)
 John Bishop
 Alan Bleasdale
 Billy Butler (now at Liverpool Live Radio)
 Graham Dene (now at Boom Radio)
 Phil Easton (deceased) 
 Neil Fitzmaurice
 Mike Flynn (who went on to have a daily show on BBC Radio Wales from 1978-89 and latterly worked for several BBC local radio stations in England)
 John Gorman
 Rob Jones (now at Boom Radio)
 Dave Kelly
 Peter Levy
 Arthur Murphy (deceased) 
 Anton Powers
 Pete Price (now at Liverpool Live Radio)
 Simon Ross (now at Greatest Hits Radio)
 Kev Seed
 Bill Shankly (deceased) 
 Norman Thomas (deceased) 
 Pete Waterman

References

External links
 
 Your Liverpool View tower tours 
 History of the station
 Details of book recounting the history of the station
 North West Radio - Radio City Memories
 David's Transmitter World
 MDS975's coverage map
 Allerton Park transmitter
 Billinge Hill transmitter
 Hope Mountain transmitter

Bauer Radio
Hits Radio
Radio stations in Merseyside
Radio stations established in 1974
Mass media in Liverpool
Radio stations in Liverpool